Augustinian nuns are the most ancient and continuous segment of the Roman Catholic Augustinian religious order under the canons of contemporary historical method. The Augustinian nuns, named after Saint Augustine of Hippo (died AD 430), are several Roman Catholic enclosed monastic communities of women living according to a guide to religious life known as the Rule of St. Augustine. Prominent Augustinian nuns include Italian mystic St. Clare of Montefalco and St. Rita of Cascia.

History
Though Augustine of Hippo probably didn't compose a formal monastic rule (despite the extant Augustinian Rule), his hortatory letter to the nuns at Hippo Regius (Epist., ccxi, Benedictine ed.) is the most ancient example on which the beginnings of this Augustinian Rule are based.

The nuns regard as their first foundation the monastery for which St. Augustine wrote the rules of life in his Epistola ccxi (alias cix) in 423. It is certain that this epistle was called the Rule of St. Augustine for nuns at an early date, and has been followed as the rule of life in many female monasteries since the 11th century. These monasteries were not consolidated in 1256, like the religious communities of Augustinian monks.
 
Each convent was independent and was not subject to the general of the order. This led to differences in rule, dress, and mode of life. Only since the 15th century have certain Augustinian Hermits reformed a number of Augustinian nunneries, become their spiritual directors, and induced them to adopt the Constitution of their order. Henceforth, there were female members of the Order of Hermits of St. Augustine in Italy, France, Spain, Belgium and later in Germany, where, however, many were suppressed during the Reformation, or by the secularizing law of 1803. In the other countries many nunneries were closed in consequence of the French Revolution. The still existing houses in the early 20th century, except Cascia, Renteria (Diocese of Vitoria), Eibar (Diocese of Vittoria) and Cracow, were under the jurisdiction of the bishop of the diocese. Many convents are celebrated for the saints whom they produced, such as Montefalco in Central Italy, the home of St. Clare of the Cross (or St. Clara of Montefalco, d. 1308), and Cascia, near Perugia, where St. Rita died in 1457. In the suppressed German convent of Agnetenberg near Dülmen, in Westphalia, lived Anne Catherine Emmerich. A number of Discalced Augustinian nuns in Valencia were martyred in the Spanish Civil War.

Foundations
The monastery of the so-called "Augustinians delle Vergini", at Venice, was founded in 1177 by pope Alexander III after his reconciliation with Holy Roman Emperor Frederick Barbarossa, whose daughter Julia, with twelve girls of noble birth, entered the monastery and became first abbess. On the French occupation in the 18th century the religious went to America, where they devoted themselves to the work of teaching and the care of the sick.

Lacock Abbey in the village of Lacock, Wiltshire, England, was founded in the early 13th century by Ela, Countess of Salisbury, as a nunnery of the Augustinian order. It remained so until the suppression of the monasteries in the 16th century;

Grace Dieu Priory was an independent Augustinian priory near Thringstone in Leicestershire, England. It was founded around 1235-1241 by Roesia de Verdon. It was dedicated to the Holy Trinity and St Mary. The priory was fairly large, having in 1337 sixteen nuns, who called themselves "the White Nuns of St. Augustine". It also had an attached hospital which cared for twelve poor people. The priory was dissolved in October 1538.

Towards the end of the 16th century communities of female Discalced Augustinians appeared in Spain. In the convent at Cybar, Mariana Manzanedo of St. Joseph instituted a reform which led to the establishment of a third, that of the female Augustinian Recollects.

Historically, the most important of the observant Augustinian congregations were the Spanish Augustinian tertiary nuns, founded in 1545 by Archbishop Thomas of Villanova at Valencia; the "reformed" Augustinian nuns who originated under the influence of Augustinian educated Carmelite St Theresa after the end of the 16th century at Madrid, Alcoy, and those founded in Portugal.

The Augustinian ethos
The teaching and writing of Augustine, the Augustinian Rule, and the lives and experiences of Augustinians over sixteen centuries help define the ethos of the order, sometimes "honoured in the breach".

The pursuit of truth through learning is key to the Augustinian ethos, balanced by the injunction to behave with love towards one another. These same imperatives of affection and fairness have driven the order in its international missionary outreach. This balanced pursuit of love and learning has energized the various branches of the order into building communities founded on mutual affection and intellectual advancement.

Augustine spoke passionately of God's "beauty so ancient and so new", and his fascination with beauty extended to music.  He taught that "to sing once is to pray twice" (Qui cantat, bis orat), and music is also a key part of the Augustinian ethos. Besides the significant musical contribution of Augustinian nun and composer Vittoria Aleotti, contemporary Augustinian musical foundations include the famous Augustinerkirche of the (male) friars in Vienna, where orchestral masses by Mozart and Schubert are performed every week, as well as the boys' choir at Sankt Florian in Austria, a school conducted by Canons Regular, a choir now over 1,000 years old.

Augustinian contemplative communities
Augustinian contemplative nuns belonging to the monasteries of the Order are members of the Order of Saint Augustine (OSA).
  
 The Augustinian Community of Santi Quattro Coronati was established in 1564. 
 The Augustinian nuns in New Lenox, Illinois are a cloistered, contemplative community.
 Our Lady of Grace Monastery in Nova Scotia is occupied by the Contemplative Augustinian Nuns.
 The Monastery of the Mother of Good Counsel at Bulacan, Philippines was established in 1998.

Around 1,500 women live in Augustinian enclosed convents in: 

 Bolivia
 Chile
 Ecuador
 Kenya
 Malta
 Mexico
 Netherlands
 Panama
 Peru
 Spain
 Switzerland

Other orders and groups of women that are not enclosed and belong within the Augustinian family. Some have been formally aggregated to the order by the prior general.
 The congregation of the Augustinian Sisters of Our Lady of Consolation (ASOLC) was founded in 1883. An institute primarily dedicated to education, it was aggregated to the Order of Saint Augustine (OSA) in May 1902. They founded the La Consolacion College Manila. 
 The Sisters of St Rita, were aggregated to the Order of Saint Augustine in 1936;

All congregations of Augustinian Sisters are not, however affiliated to the Order of St Augustine. Others follow the Rule of Augustine and remain independent congregations. The Augustinian Sisters of Mercy of Jesus (South Africa), the Augustinian Recollects and the Sisters of Our Lady of Consolation (both in the Philippines), the Congregation of Our Lady of the Missions, the Sisters of Charity of the Incarnate Word (who established the University of the Incarnate Word in Texas), and the Sisters of St Joan of Arc (in Quebec, United States, and Rome) are just some of the Augustinian family of orders who are not enclosed women. The Sisters of Life are a relatively new order (founded 1991 by Cardinal O'Connor) who follow the Augustinian rule. The Bridgettines follow the Rule of St. Augustine.

There are other Augustinian nuns in the Anglican Communion.

Notable Augustinian women
 Saint Juliana of Mount Cornillon (1193–1258), reformer
 Saint Clare of Montefalco (c. 1268 – 18 August 1318), Italian mystic  
 Saint Rita of Cascia (1381–1457), Mother and mystic 
 Blessed Maria Teresa Fasce, abbess
 Blessed Helen of Udine, Mother and nun
 Margaret Haydock (1767?-1845), of the ancient English Catholic Recusant Haydock family
 Vittoria Aleotti, Italian composer

See also
 Augustinians
 Augustinian nuns in the Anglican Communion
 Discalced Augustinians
 Order of Augustinian Recollects
 Canonesses
 Independent Augustinian Communities

References

Sources
 Bibliography for the Augustinian official website
 Augustine of Hippo, The Rule of St Augustine Constitutiones Ordinis Fratrum S. Augustini (Rome 1968)
 
 
 Orbis Augustinianus sive conventuum O. Erem. S. A. chorographica et topographica descriptio Augustino Lubin, Paris, 1659, 1671, 1672.
 Regle de S. Augustin pour lei religieuses de son .ordre; et Constitutions de la Congregation des Religieuses du Verbe-Incarne et du Saint-Sacrament (Lyon: Chez Pierre Guillimin, 1662), pp. 28–29. Cf. later edition published at Lyon (Chez Briday, Libraire,1962), pp. 22–24. English edition, The Rule of Saint Augustine and the Constitutions of the Order of the Incarnate Word and Blessed Sacrament (New York: Schwartz, Kirwin, and Fauss, 1893), pp. 33–35.

External links
 International Order of St. Augustine
 October 2009+02:14:53  Text of the Rule of St. Augustine
 Augustinian nuns at Cascia, Italy
 List of Augustinian Saints
 Augustinian Missionary Sisters
 Order of the Hermit Friars of St. Augustine (O.S.A.)
 Congregation of The Guesthouse Sisters Augustinnes, Leuven in ODIS – Online Database for Intermediary Structures 
 Archives of Guesthouse sisters-Augustinnes – Leuven in ODIS – Online Database for Intermediary Structures 
 Sisters of St. Rita

 
Mendicant orders
Nuns
Augustinian orders
History of Catholic religious orders